Giant for a Day! is the tenth album by British progressive rock band Gentle Giant which was released in 1978. The band's previous use of counterpoint and medieval-themed arrangements was not present on this recording. This album features a pop rock sensibility, instead of their usual progressive rock sound. Unlike the previous albums, the band did not make any tour or concerts to support this album. From the album only the title track was ever played live by the band during its final tour supporting the Civilian album.

Track listing
All lead vocals by Derek Shulman, except where noted.

Personnel
Gentle Giant
Gary Green – electric guitar (tracks 1, 2, 4, 5, 9), electric guitars (tracks 3, 6, 8, 10), slide guitar (track 2), acoustic guitar (tracks 2, 7), backing vocals
Kerry Minnear – piano (tracks 4–6, 9, 10), electric piano (tracks 1, 4, 5, 8, 10), Minimoog (tracks 3–5), Hammond organ (track 2), Clavinet (track 1), synthesizer (track 4), xylophone (track 4), bass (tracks 2, 7), backing vocals
Derek Shulman – lead vocals all tracks except tracks 4 and 7
Ray Shulman – bass (tracks 1, 3–6, 8–10), 12-string guitar (tracks 2, 7), backing vocals
John Weathers – drums (tracks 1–6, 8–10), tambourine (tracks 1, 5), shaker (track 4), cowbell (track 10), backing vocals, lead vocals on track 7

Release details
1978, UK, Chrysalis Records CHR-1186, release date 29 September 1978, LP
1978, UK, Chrysalis Records CHR-1186, release date ? ? 1978, Cassette
1978, US, Capitol Records SW-11813, release date 11 September 1978, LP
1978, US, Capitol Records SW-11813, release date ? ? 1978, Cassette
1978, Brazil, Chrysalis Records 6307 636, release date ? ? 1978, LP
?, US, Capitol Records SN-16045, release date ? ? ?, LP (re-release)
?, US, Capitol Records 17892, release date ? ? ?, CD
1993, UK, Road Goes On Forever RGFCD 1007, release date ? ? 1993, CD (with lyric sleeve)
1994, UK, Terrapin Trucking TRUCKCD007, release date 18 July 1994, CD (re-master)
1996, US, One Way CD 18470, release date 16 March 1996, CD
1999, UK, Beat Goes On BGOCD431, release date 16 April 1999, CD (2× CD with The Missing Piece)
2005, UK, DRT Entertainment RTE355, release date 5 September 2005, CD (35th Anniversary Enhanced Re-Master)

References

1978 albums
Gentle Giant albums
Chrysalis Records albums
Capitol Records albums